John Clement may refer to:

John Clement (Ontario politician) (1928–2014), politician in Ontario, Canada
John Clement (physician) (c. 1500–1572), English Roman Catholic physician and humanist
John Clement, baseball player in the 1956 Olympics
John Clement Gordon (1644–1726), bishop of Galloway, Scotland
Johnny Clement (1919–1969), American football player
Jack Clement (1931–2013), American singer/songwriter and record/film producer
John Clement, Count of Branicki (1689–1771), Polish nobleman, magnate and Hetman
John Clement (MP), in 1539, MP for Bath

See also

John Clements (disambiguation)